Methylnitronitrosoguanidine (MNNG or MNG, NTG when referred to colloquially as nitrosoguanidine) is a biochemical tool used experimentally as a carcinogen and mutagen. It acts by adding alkyl groups to the O6 of guanine and O4 of thymine, which can lead to transition mutations between GC and AT. These changes do not cause a heavy distortion in the double helix of DNA and thus are hard to detect by the DNA mismatch repair system.

One of the earliest uses of methylnitronitrosoguanidine was in 1985. A group of scientists tested whether or not the chemical composition of methylnitronitrosoguanidine would directly affect the growth of tumors and cancer cells in rats.

In the experiment, the cancer cells from a Japanese cancer patient was injected into 8 rats. The biochemical tool and showed a decline of cancer cells in a few of the rats' bodies.

In organic chemistry, MNNG is used as a source of diazomethane when reacted with aqueous potassium hydroxide.

MNNG is a probable human carcinogen listed as an IARC Group 2A carcinogen.

Stability
MNNG produces diazomethane (known DNA methylating agent) in basic aqueous solutions, and nitrous acid (also mutagenic) in acidic solutions.

References

IARC Group 2A carcinogens
Mutagens
Nitroguanidines
Nitrosoguanidines